David W. Smith (born March 17, 1948)  is an American baseball historian and analyst.  He is best known as the founder of Retrosheet, a volunteer organization whose mission is to collect, digitize, and distribute play-by-play accounts from every game in Major League Baseball history.  Smith's work has been widely praised as a huge boon to baseball research and he has received a number of awards for his work, several from SABR. 

Smith has also done original baseball research on topics such as:
 Maury Wills and the Value of a Stolen Base 
 The 1951 National League Pennant Race 
 The Effect of Batting Order on Scoring 
 Why do Home Teams Score so Much in the First Inning? 
 The Myth of the Closer 
 Why Do Games Take so Long?

Smith was a contributor to Total Baseball and was co-author of the book The Midsummer Classic: The Complete History of Baseball's All-Star Game (with David W. Vincent and Lyle Spatz). That book received The Sporting News-SABR Baseball Research Award in 2001.

Smith received the 2001 Society of American Baseball Research's "SABR Salute" and the 2005 Bob Davids Award. Smith also received SABR's 2012 Henry Chadwick Award. Smith received the Tony Salin Memorial Award from the Baseball Reliquary in 2008 and the (SABR) Doug Pappas Award (for best oral research presentation) in 2001 and 2016.
	
In 1975, Smith joined the faculty of the biology department at the University of Delaware, and retired as an emeritus professor in 2014. His specialty was microbiology, with an emphasis on ecology, genetics, and evolution. He was the director of the undergraduate biology program and the grievance officer of the Delaware chapter of the American Association of University Professors. He won the University's Excellence in Teaching Award in 1977, and was Faculty Senate President in 1983–1984. Smith did his undergraduate work at the University of California, San Diego, received a master's degree from Indiana University, and earned his PhD from the University of Wisconsin–Madison.

References

External links

 Faculty page at UD Department of Biology (2011)
Retrosheet
New York Times article on Smith 
Wall Street Journal profile (April 24, 2002)
Remember the Game When?, UD Messenger 11:1 (2002) – on Smith's work with LA Dodgers
Biologist Also Baseball Stat Hound, UDaily (December 4, 2004)
The Midsummer Classic– publicity from publisher 
 

1948 births
Living people
Baseball statisticians
American microbiologists
University of Delaware faculty
Place of birth missing (living people)
University of California, San Diego alumni
University of Wisconsin–Madison alumni